George Sai Wah Tsao was a professor of the School of Biomedical Sciences of the University of Hong Kong and the Director of the Faculty Core Facility of the Faculty of Medicine, the University of Hong Kong. Tsao researches the relationship between Epstein-Barr virus and nasopharyngeal carcinoma. He also created the first immortal human ovarian surface epithelial cell line.

Education
Tsao graduated from the Chinese University of Hong Kong with a BSc degree, and received his PhD training at the University of London, Royal Marsden Hospital.

Career
Tsao became a faculty member of the Chinese University of Hong Kong after receiving postgraduate training. However, he went to the Harvard Medical School to receive further postdoctoral training in 1987. Later on, he was appointed the Laboratory Director of the Gynecological Oncology Division, Brigham and Women's Hospital and Assistant Professor in Obstetrics and Gynecology, Harvard Medical School. He joined the University of Hong Kong in 1993, and is currently a faculty member of the Department of Anatomy and the Deputy Director of the Center for Cancer Research, the University of Hong Kong Li Ka Shing Faculty of Medicine.

Tsao passed away in December 2022.

Research
Tsao's main research interest is nasopharyngeal carcinoma and Epstein-Barr virus, involving cell immortalization and malignant transformation. Emphasis is put on the relationship between latent infection of nasopharyngeal epithelial cells by Epstein-Barr virus and nasopharyngeal carcinoma.

2021 Retraction. 
http://retractiondatabase.org/RetractionSearch.aspx#?auth%3dTsao%252c%2bSW

2017 Expression of Concern.
http://retractiondatabase.org/RetractionSearch.aspx#?auth%3dTsao%252c%2bSai%2bWah
https://retractionwatch.com/2017/10/27/caught-notice-concerns-image-2008-paper-prompt-editorial-notice/

References

Living people
Alumni of the University of London
Harvard Medical School faculty
Chinese medical researchers
Academic staff of the University of Hong Kong
Year of birth missing (living people)